The Zhireken mine is one of the largest molybdenum mines in Russia. The mine is located near Zhireken in south-west Russia in Zabaykalsky Krai. The Zhireken mine has reserves amounting to 57.3 million tonnes of molybdenum ore grading 0.05% molybdenum thus resulting 28,700 tonnes of molybdenum.

See also
List of molybdenum mines

References 

Molybdenum mines in Russia